Vasilevo may refer to:

 Vasilevo, Bulgaria, a village in Dobrich Province
 Vasilevo, North Macedonia, a village in Vasilevo Municipality
 Despotovo, formerly Vasiljevo, a village in Serbia